The EcoLeague is a six-college consortium consisting of Alaska Pacific University in Anchorage, Alaska; Northland College in Ashland, Wisconsin; New College of Florida in Sarasota, Florida; Prescott College in Prescott, Arizona; College of the Atlantic in Bar Harbor, Maine; and Dickinson College in Carlisle, Pennsylvania.

Programs
The EcoLeague offers studies in marine biology, sustainable business, and natural and cultural history interpretation.

The consortium is unique in that each college is in a different geographic area. Despite a wide variation in structure and culture, the five colleges have strong programs in environmental studies. The idea behind the consortium is the ability to experience learning in virtually every major biome of the United States, based on their mission of promoting a "bio-regional education for sustainability".

History
The EcoLeague was founded as a result of a visionary call from students with a proposal improve academic collaboration and mobility related to urgent issues of global sustainability. The consortium design, including student and faculty exchange program and regular cross-college conferences, was first founded by students at Prescott College who articulated the original vision in 1996 and convened colleges under the consortium as the North American Alliance for Green Education (NAAGE), and later rebranded as "the Eco League". These institutions included Northland College in Ashland, Wisconsin; Prescott College in Prescott, Arizona; College of the Atlantic in Bar Harbor, Maine; and Dickinson College in Carlisle, Pennsylvania, all current members of the consortium. Former consortium members included Antioch College, Green Mountain College, Naropa University, Sterling College, Unity College and Warren Wilson College, and Audubon Expedition Institute.

Green Mountain College closure
In 2019, Green Mountain College in Poultney, Vermont (formally a member of the EcoLeague) announced it would be closing at the end of the spring semester, reducing the consortium down to five colleges. Green Mountain concurrently announced an agreement with Prescott College (an EcoLeague colleague) to support their students through the completion of their degrees, hiring on board several faculty, and developing an area of the college (to be determined) to carry on the Green Mountain name.

External links
Official website

References

College and university associations and consortia in the United States
Antioch College